Meson Ray is the third, and last, studio album by the alternative rock band the Ernies, released in 1999. Meson Ray was the first record by the Ernies to be released under Mojo Records. The album includes the band's biggest single, "Here and Now," which was featured in the popular 1999 video game Tony Hawk's Pro Skater, as well as in the 2004 documentary The Rise & Fall Of ECW.

Critical reception
The Washington Post wrote that "even if the band's instrumental arsenal were suddenly muted by a power failure, its lyrics would suggest an almost relentlessly manic pulse tempered by a disarming sense of irony and humor." CMJ New Music Report wrote: "Partying like it's 1989, the Ernies are to skate culture what the Black Crowes are to classic rock 'n' roll--a soothing throwback to a period of time close to the heart of funk rock historians."

Track listing
All songs written by Will Hummel, except where noted. 
"Polarized" - 3:49
"Here and Now" - 3:30
"Fire" (Hummel, Mike Hughes) - 3:16
"Winter Stars (You and I)" - 4:02
"Organism" - 5:23
"The Hitman Tommy Stearns" - 4:50
"It's Digestible" - 3:26
"Where Do You Hide?" - 3:35
"Bacteria" - 3:19
"You Are Everywhere" - 2:25
"Mr. Benson and the Meson Ray (SOD-1)" (Hughes, Hayes Smith) - 3:33

Band members
Mike Hughes - bass, vocals
Matt Goves - drums
Hayes Smith - saxophone, vocals
Chris Bondi - turntables, theremin
Will Hummel - vocals, guitar, keyboards

References

1999 albums
The Ernies albums
Albums produced by Howard Benson
Mojo Records albums